Koko Crater (Hawaiian: Kohelepelepe or Puʻu Mai) is an extinct tuff cone located on the Hawaiian island of Oʻahu near Hawaiʻi Kai. It is northeast of Hanauma Bay and south of the Koʻolau Range.

Geology 
Koko Crater is a part of the Honolulu Volcanics, which were craters that formed as vents of the Koʻolau Volcano during its rejuvenation stage. Other notable landmarks within the Honolulu Volcanics include nearby Hanauma Bay and the well-known Diamond Head crater.

Koko Crater, Hanauma Bay and other nearby tuff cones form the Koko Rift Zone, which marks the latest episode of volcanic activity on the island of Oahu. Radiocarbon dating suggests that the latest eruption within the Koko Rift Zone occurred 7,000 years ago, although the validity of these results are disputed. Its elevation is 1,208 ft (368 m), making it the tallest and most preserved tuff cone in the area.

Trail 
During World War II, the US military built bunkers on top of Koko Crater with a railroad leading to its summit. In 1966, the air force ceded administration of Koko Crater over to the City of Honolulu. It was then renamed to the Koko Head Regional Park. Within this park is the Koko Crater Trail, which is a 1.8-mile-long trail that uses the now-abandoned railroad as its pathway.

See also 

 Honolulu Volcanics
 Koko Head

References 

Volcanoes of Oahu
Tuff cones
Geography of Honolulu County, Hawaii